House Mountain is a natural landmark in Rockbridge County, Virginia, USA. The mountain consists of two peaks, one called "Little House Mountain" and the other "Big House Mountain". Situated five miles from Lexington, it is a popular hiking trail for the people of the city and the surrounding counties.

References

Mountains of Rockbridge County, Virginia
Mountains of Virginia